The 1992 FIFA Futsal World Championship qualification (AFC) was held in Hong Kong, from 1 May to 3 May 1992.

Draw

Group stage

Group A

Group B

See also 
 1992 FIFA Futsal World Championship

References

External links 
 RSSSF – Asian Futsal World Cup Qualifiers 1992

Qual
1992
1991–92 in Hong Kong football
1991–92 in Iranian football
1992 in Japanese football
1992 in Chinese football
1992 in Asian football